Hans and Franz are characters in a recurring sketch called "Pumping Up with Hans & Franz" on the television sketch comedy show Saturday Night Live, played by Dana Carvey and Kevin Nealon, respectively.

Description
In the sketch, Carvey and Nealon play a pair of muscle-bound Austrian bodybuilders in the mold of Arnold Schwarzenegger, using padding for fake muscles, drab gray sweatsuits, weight belts, and speaking with Austrian accents. The background of the set includes several life-sized cutouts of Schwarzenegger during his competition years. The sketch's introductory and ending music featured mock Austrian yodeling.

"Pumping Up" primarily consists of Hans and Franz denigrating others for not being strong and as physically fit as they appear to be, striking bodybuilder poses to show off their "muscled" bodies, complete with strained facial expressions. Schwarzenegger made one guest appearance in the sketch (to much applause) in which he ridicules "his cousins" for being "girlie" and weak. Another sketch was done in response to recent sports news, where a "Saturday Night Live editorial" showed Hans and Franz barking back at a recent remark by Jimmy the Greek that African men were more apt to be muscular than European men.

One sketch that did not have the pair in their signature sweatsuits and leather belts was a Halloween episode. Hans and Franz both dressed up as their idol, Arnold Schwarzengger, specifically Franz as the T-800 from Terminator 2: Judgment Day and Hans as the titular character from the first film. The two compared how their Terminators were tougher, then derided other "girlie" costumes, even a boy who was Superman. Rather than hand out high sugar candy, Hans and Franz gave "treats" of Vitamin C pills, coconut oil, and bee pollen to encourage kids to stay in shape.

Development

The idea for the characters of Hans and Franz came in 1987 in a Des Moines, Iowa, hotel room while Nealon was watching an Arnold Schwarzenegger television interview during Nealon's and Carvey's first comedy tour. The first sketch in which the characters appear occurred during the season premiere of the 13th season.

Other appearances

After Carvey left the show, the sketch was retired. However, a 1994 episode where Carvey hosted had Hans and Franz appearing as guest commentators as Weekend Update, with the pair mentioning they took some time off and were dismayed at the show's crew for dismantling their set. Franz also considered the Weekend Update sketches were not good since they replaced the past anchor (also played by Kevin Nealon).

A short sketch was filmed for the show's 1999 primetime 25th Anniversary Special which spoofed VH1's Behind the Music specials, but time constraints prevented it from airing. It appeared in a later episode that season. In the sketch, Hans and Franz tell the story of how they were reunited in Hollywood when Franz unsuspectingly had his buttocks "read" by Hans.

In 2014, the duo appeared in several State Farm commercials with Green Bay Packers quarterback Aaron Rodgers.

Proposed film

Starting in the early 1990s, a Hans and Franz film was in development, with the working title Hans and Franz Go to Hollywood. In a 2010 interview on Conan, Nealon and host Conan O'Brien discussed being holed up in a Santa Monica hotel room for a month with Carvey and Robert Smigel working on the script for what was then intended to be a musical. Carvey discussed the script under the title Hans and Franz: The Girlyman Dilemma during a 2016 interview with Howard Stern. Schwarzenegger expressed an interest and was at one point to co-produce, but ultimately declined to participate following the poor reception of his self-parodying vehicle Last Action Hero. The disastrous box office performances of the SNL spinoff movies Stuart Saves His Family and It's Pat likely hurt the film's prospects, but Schwarzenegger dropping out proved an insurmountable obstacle.

Cultural references
NASA's two crawler-transporters—large diesel-powered transport devices used since 1965 to carry heavy launch loads to the launch site, including fully assembled spacecraft from the Apollo, Skylab, and Shuttle eras—are also nicknamed "Hans" (CT-1) and "Franz" (CT-2).

In the Teenage Mutant Ninja Turtles episode "Planet of the Turtles" there are Hans and Fitz, two alien turtle wrestlers who act in the fashion of Hans and Franz. Later in the episode "Leonardo Cuts Loose", Hans and Fitz are two Austrian bodybuilding villains.

In the popular MMO World of Warcraft, Hans'gar and Franzok are twin brothers in the Blackrock Foundry raid.  With a throwback to the Saturday Night Live characters, Franzok can be heard yelling "Hear me now and believe me later!"

In the pop-culture comedy Dude, Where's My Car?, there are two blonde Germanic spacemen who act in the fashion of Hans and Franz.

In the FPS Borderlands, there are Hanz and Franz as bodyguards of one of the final game bosses, Baron Flynt.

In Sesame Street Season 38 Episode 5, Hansel and Gretel introduce themselves and reference the Hans and Franz tagline "We just want to pump...you up!" changed to "We just want to throw...bread crumbs!"

In the Marvel Comics story Incredible Hulk vs. Venom #1 (April 1994), the two titular characters go on a news show and taunt the villain of the story in the style of Hans and Franz, including threatening to "beat (clap) [him] up!" 

German supermodel Heidi Klum nicknamed her breasts Hans and Franz. However, given the differing nationalities (Klum is German and Franz and Hans are Austrian), it has never been confirmed if this was in homage to the SNL sketch, nor has she made mention as such.

See also
 Recurring Saturday Night Live characters and sketches

References

Saturday Night Live sketches
Fictional Austrian people
Fictional bodybuilders
Television duos
Cultural depictions of Arnold Schwarzenegger
Saturday Night Live in the 1980s